St. Cuan's Well is a holy well and National Monument located in County Galway, Ireland.

Location

St. Cuan's Well is located 2.3 km (1.4 miles) northeast of Ahascragh, 4 km (2½ miles) west of the River Suck.

History
Saint Cúan (died AD 752) was an Irish abbot. A pattern was held here on 15 October. Local belief associated the water with miraculous cures and claimed that the water of the well could not be boiled. There was formerly a rag tree beside the well.

Description
The holy well is surrounded by a low wall. A cross slab is next to this enclosure.

References

National Monuments in County Galway
Archaeological sites in County Galway
Cuan